Les Chenaux (meaning the channels in French) is a regional county municipality in central Quebec, Canada, in the Mauricie region. The seat is in Saint-Luc-de-Vincennes. It is located adjacent on the east of Trois-Rivières on the Saint Lawrence River. Its largest community is the parish of Notre-Dame-du-Mont-Carmel.

Les Chenaux is one of the few regional county municipalities in Quebec that does not constitute its own census division; instead, it is grouped with Trois-Rivières as the single census division of Francheville.

Geography
The "Les Chenaux" RCM is an area east of Trois-Rivières, located between the villages of Champlain and Sainte-Anne-de-la-Pérade on north shore of St. Lawrence River. The MRC is approximately 40 km in length to about 20 kilometers in depth. The territory is crossed by three rivers flowing from north to south: Champlain River, Batiscan River and Sainte-Anne River.

History
The RCM was created in 2002, when the area was realigned to make way for the amalgamations of nearby Trois-Rivières and Shawinigan. All of the municipalities, except for Notre-Dame-du-Mont-Carmel (which came from Centre-de-la-Mauricie RCM), used to belong to the former Francheville Regional County Municipality. This RCM was dissolved when six of its municipalities amalgamated with the city of Trois-Rivières, and Saint-Étienne-des-Grès was added to the Maskinongé RCM. The remaining municipalities were grouped into a new regional county called Les Chenaux.

Subdivisions
There are 10 subdivisions within the RCM:

Municipalities (6)
 Batiscan
 Champlain
 Saint-Luc-de-Vincennes
 Saint-Prosper-de-Champlain
 Saint-Stanislas
 Sainte-Anne-de-la-Pérade

Parishes (4)
 Notre-Dame-du-Mont-Carmel
 Saint-Maurice
 Saint-Narcisse
 Sainte-Geneviève-de-Batiscan

Demography

Transportation

Access routes
Highways and numbered routes that run through the municipality, including external routes that start or finish at the county border:

 Autoroutes
 

 Principal Highways
 
 
 

 Secondary Highways
 
 
 
 
 

 External Routes
 None

See also
 List of regional county municipalities and equivalent territories in Quebec
 Lordship of Sainte-Anne-de-la-Pérade
 Lordship of Batiscan
 Lordship of Champlain

References